This is an article about a women's basketball team. For a 19th-century Polish student movement, see Filaret Association.
The Filarets was a women's basketball team in Rochester, New York that played in the 1930s, 1940s and 1950s. They were a regional and national powerhouse, winning a record 211 consecutive games between 1940 and 1944.

History
In the 1930s, St. Stanislaus Church in Rochester, New York started a girls' basketball team as part of its teens recreation program. The team was called the Filarets and was coached by Roy Van Graflan, an American League baseball umpire. They played by men's rules against mostly women's and some men's teams. In 1932–33, they won 25 of 26 games. By 1940, they had a record of 338 wins and 12 losses. On February 25, 1940, they scored 100 points in a 100–16 win against Utica's Sacred Heart. In 11 years, their record was 523 wins and 12 losses.

The team often packed Falcon Hall, and sometimes played a lead-in game for the Rochester Seagrams (predecessor to the NBL and NBA and the Rochester Royals). They once played against the Harlem Globetrotters (a rare loss for them). The team folded in 1957, with an unofficial 554 wins.

Notable players

 Virginia Adams
 Sophie Bukowski
 Helen Finn
 Irene Grzywinski Harris
 Dot Gulewicz
 Rose Grucza
 Olga Hanchar - Captain
 Betty Howland
 Mary McGrail
 Bernice Riker
 Jean Upchurch
 Mickey Verhoeven 
 Stella Walsh
 Verna Wilson

References

External links
 A Brief History of Rochester's Polish American Community
 Special Collections, Abbey of the Genesee
 Syracuse Post Standard, March 23, 1946

Sports in Rochester, New York
Basketball teams in New York (state)
1930s establishments in New York (state)
1957 disestablishments in New York (state)
Sports clubs established in the 1930s
Sports clubs disestablished in 1957